The Netherlands was represented by three-sister group Hearts of Soul, with the song "Waterman", at the 1970 Eurovision Song Contest, which took place in Amsterdam on 21 March. "Waterman" was the winner of the Dutch national final for the contest, held on 11 February.

Although "Waterman" was a very contemporary-sounding song in the style of popular American group The 5th Dimension, its victory at the national final was contentious as it was chosen over the clear public favourite, the folk music-influenced "Spinnewiel" by Saskia and Serge. The decision by broadcaster NOS to select Saskia and Serge internally as the Dutch representatives the following year was widely seen as a tacit acknowledgement that public opinion would have preferred them as the representatives in 1970.

Before Eurovision

Nationaal Songfestival 1970 
The final was held on 11 February 1970 at the Congresgebouw in The Hague, hosted by Pim Jacobs. Ten songs took part and the winning song was chosen by a national and an international jury, the latter consisting of ambassadorial staff from other nations based in the Netherlands. "Waterman" emerged the winner by 1 point over "Spinnewiel".

As well as Saskia and Serge, future Dutch representatives Sandra Reemer (1972, 1976 and 1979) and Ben Cramer (1973) were also among the participants.

At Eurovision 
On the night of the final Hearts of Soul performed first in the running order, preceding Switzerland. 1970 was the last year in which Eurovision rules only allowed for solo performers or duos, so to circumvent this the group was billed as 'Patricia and the Hearts of Soul' and the song was staged with Patricia singing up front and Bianca and Stella standing behind and to the left of her, ostensibly as backing singers. At the close of voting "Waterman" had received 7 points (3 from Italy and Yugoslavia and 1 from the United Kingdom), placing the Netherlands 7th of the 12 entries. The Dutch jury awarded its highest mark (5) to contest winners Ireland.

The Dutch entry was conducted at the contest by the musical director Dolf van der Linden.

Under the name of Dream Express, the group would later represent Belgium in the 1977 contest, while Stella also represented Belgium as a solo singer in 1982.

Voting

References

External links 
 Dutch Preselection 1970

1970
Countries in the Eurovision Song Contest 1970
Eurovision